Shining Harvest is an Australian novel by E. V. Timms. It was the ninth in his Great South Land Saga of novels.

It concerns the struggle between two brothers on a sheep station in northwest New South Wales.

References

External links
Shining Harvest at AustLit

1956 Australian novels
Novels set in New South Wales
Angus & Robertson books